XHZER-FM is a radio station in Zacatecas, Zacatecas. Broadcasting on 96.5 FM from a tower on Cerro de la Virgen, XHZER is owned by Grupo Radiofónico ZER and is known as "La Líder Stereo ZER".

History
XHZER received its concession and signed on June 22, 1990.

Repeaters

XHZER has two 500-watt repeaters in Fresnillo and Jerez de García Salinas.

References

Regional Mexican radio stations
Radio stations in Zacatecas
Zacatecas City